Elvira Kovács (born 18 July 1982) is a Serbian politician from the country's Hungarian community. She has served in the National Assembly of Serbia since 2007 as a member of the Alliance of Vojvodina Hungarians (Vajdasági Magyar Szövetség, VMSZ).

Early life and career
Kovács was born in Zrenjanin, in what was then the Socialist Autonomous Province of Vojvodina in the Socialist Republic of Serbia, Socialist Federal Republic of Yugoslavia. She graduated from faculty of economics at the Subotica campus of the University of Novi Sad in 2006 and worked for the health and social policy secretariat in the executive council of Vojvodina until July 2007.

Politician
Kovács joined the VMSZ in 2000, became a regional trainer for the National Democratic Institute in 2005, and joined the presidency of the VMSZ's youth forum in 2006.

Member of the National Assembly

Koštunica and Cvetković administrations (2007–12)
Kovács received the 224th position on the VMSZ's electoral list in the 2007 Serbian parliamentary election. The list won three seats. She was not initially included in the party's delegation but was awarded a mandate on 18 July 2007 as a replacement for Andrea Galgó Ferenci, who had resigned. (From 2000 to 2011, Serbian parliamentary mandates were awarded to sponsoring parties or coalitions rather than to individual candidates, and it was common practice for the mandates to be assigned out of numerical order. Kovács's specific position on the list had no formal bearing on whether or when she received a mandate.) She served in opposition to Vojislav Koštunica's administration over the next year. In her first term, she was a member of the committee for culture and information.

For the 2008 parliamentary election, Kovács received the fourth position on the electoral list of the Hungarian Coalition, a multi-party alliance led by the VMSZ. The coalition won four seats, all of which were assigned to VMSZ members, and she was chosen for a second term in the assembly. The For a European Serbia alliance formed a coalition government with the Socialist Party of Serbia (Socijalistička partija Srbije, SPS) after the election, and the VMSZ provided crucial support to the administration in parliament. Kovács was for this term a member of the committee on labour, veterans' affairs, and social affairs; a member of the committee on development and international economic relations; a member of a working group on the rights of the child; a deputy member of the committee on agriculture, the committee on petitions and proposals, and the committee for local self-government; and a member of the parliamentary friendship groups with Croatia, Germany, Italy, and Slovakia.

Kovács also led the Hungarian Coalition's electoral list in Zrenjanin for the 2008 Serbian local elections, which were held concurrently with the national assembly vote. The list won two mandates, and she did not take a seat in the city assembly.

Dačić and Vučić administrations (2012–2017)
Serbia's electoral system was reformed in 2011, such that all mandates were awarded to candidates on successful lists in numerical order. Kovács received the third position on the VMSZ's list in the 2012 parliamentary election and was re-elected when the list won five mandates. The Serbian Progressive Party (Srpska napredna stranks, SNS) won the election and afterward formed a new coalition government with the SPS and other parties; the VMSZ declined an offer to join the government and served in opposition, at least nominally, for the next two years. Kovács was a member of the committee on the rights of the child and the committee on human and minority rights and gender equality; a deputy member of the committee on finance, budget, and control of public spending; and a member of the friendship groups with Germany and Slovakia. She was also, for a time, a member of Serbia's delegation to the Parliamentary Assembly of the Black Sea Economic Cooperation (PABSEC), before being succeeded by fellow party member Zoltán Pék.

She again received the third position on the VMSZ list in the 2014 parliamentary election and was elected to a fourth term when the list won six seats. The party began supporting Serbia's SNS-led administration in the assembly after this election. In this parliament, Kovács was deputy chair of the European integration committee, a member of the human rights committee and the committee on the rights of the child, and a deputy member of the health and family committee and the committee on labour, social affairs, social inclusion, and poverty reduction. She continued her membership in the friendship groups with Germany and Slovakia.

Kovács was promoted to second place on the VMSZ list for the 2016 parliamentary election and was re-elected even as the party fell to four seats overall. She continued as deputy chair of the European integration committee and also remained a member of the committees on human rights and the rights of the child and the friendship groups with Germany and Slovakia. In addition, she was deputy chair of a European Union–Serbia stabilization and association committee, a deputy member of the committee on constitutional and legislative issues, a member of the working group for the political empowerment of persons with disabilities, and a member of the working group for national minority rights.

Brnabić administration (2017–present)
The VMSZ led a successful drive to increase its voter turnout in the 2020 Serbian parliamentary election and won a record nine seats. Kovács, who once again appeared in the second list position, was elected to a sixth term. On 22 October 2020, she was chosen as a vice-president (i.e., deputy speaker) of the assembly. She was also promoted to chair of the European integration committee, remained deputy chair of the stabilization and association committee, served on the foreign affairs committee and the committee on the rights of the child, was the leader of Serbia's parliamentary friendship group with Denmark, and once again remained a member of the friendship groups with Germany and Slovakia.

She again appeared in the second position on the VMSZ's list in the 2022 parliamentary election and was elected to a seventh term as the party fell back to five seats. She was subsequently chosen for another term as an assembly vice-president. Kovács is also chair of the European integration committee, a member of the foreign affairs committee, the committee on the rights of the child, and the European Union–Serbia stabilization and association committee, and the friendship groups with Denmark, Germany, Hungary, and Sweden.

Member of the Parliamentary Assembly of the Council of Europe
Kovács served as a substitute member of Serbia's delegation to the Parliamentary Assembly of the Council of Europe (PACE) from October 2007 to October 2012 and again from January 2013 to May 2014. She was promoted to full membership on 23 May 2014 and has served in this role since that time. She sits with the parliamentary group of the European People's Party and has been a vice-chair of the group on three occasions.

Kovács was chair of the PACE committee on equality and non-discrimination from 2018 to 2020 and remains a full member of the committee. She chaired the sub-committee on gender equality from January to December 2020 and now chairs the sub-committee on the rights of minorities. She is also a member of the committee on honouring the obligations and commitments by member states of the Council of Europe. In May 2017, she affirmed that Serbia was still working toward its strategic goal of membership in the European Union.

On 24 January 2022, Kovács was named as a vice-president of the PACE assembly.

References

1982 births
Living people
Politicians from Zrenjanin
21st-century Serbian women politicians
21st-century Serbian politicians
Members of the National Assembly (Serbia)
Members of the Parliamentary Assembly of the Council of Europe
Members of the Parliamentary Assembly of the Black Sea Economic Cooperation
Alliance of Vojvodina Hungarians politicians
European People's Party politicians
Women members of the National Assembly (Serbia)